NS11, NS-11, NS 11, NS.11, or variation, may refer to:

Places
 Sembawang MRT station (station code: NS11), Sembawang, Singapore
 Sasabe Station (station code: NS11), Kawanishi, Hyōgo Prefecture, Japan
 Ina-Chūō Station (station code: NS11), Ina, Saitama, Japan
 Colchester North (provincial electoral district), constituency N.S. 11; Nova Scotia, Canada
 Commewijne District (FIPS region code NS11), Suriname

Other uses
 Blue Origin NS-11, a 2019 May 2 Blue Origin suborbital spaceflight mission for the New Shepard
 RAF airship N.S. 11, a North Sea class blimp

See also

 NS (disambiguation)
 11 (disambiguation)

Disambiguation pages